Frank Herbert Foss (b. Augusta, Maine, September 20, 1865 – d. Fitchburg, Massachusetts, February 15, 1947) was a United States Representative from Massachusetts.

He attended public schools in Augusta, Maine and graduated from Kent Hill (Maine) Seminary in 1886. He moved to Fitchburg in 1893.

Foss was a member of the Bricklayers, Masons, and Plasterers International Union of America Union, number 19, until 1895 when he took out an honorable withdrawal card and became a general contractor engaged in the construction of industrial plants.

He was a member of the Fitchburg city council (1906–1912); water commissioner (1913–1915); mayor of Fitchburg (1917–1920); member of the Republican State committee (1915–1946), and served as chairman (1921–1924).

He was a delegate to every Republican State Convention held between 1915 and 1946. He was elected as a Republican to the 69th Congress and the following four Congresses (March 4, 1925 – January 3, 1935). He was an unsuccessful candidate for reelection in 1934 to the 74th Congress, and resumed management in the contracting business.

He resided in Fitchburg until his death there on February 15, 1947, aged 81; interment in Forest Hill Cemetery.

References

External links
 

 
 

1865 births
1947 deaths
Politicians from Augusta, Maine
Politicians from Fitchburg, Massachusetts
Mayors of places in Massachusetts
Massachusetts city council members
American bricklayers
Republican Party members of the United States House of Representatives from Massachusetts
Massachusetts Republican Party chairs